Joy Young Rogers (August 14, 1891 – December 10, 1953) was an American suffragette. She served as an assistant editor of The Suffragist.

Biography
Joy Oden Young was born on August 14, 1891, in Falls Church, Virginia, to Ludwick Craven Young (1841–1930) and  Harriet Noyes Oden (1861–1938).

On May 1, 1916, she delivered a basket of flowers to President Woodrow Wilson, which also contained a request for a suffrage amendment and pro-suffrage messages from women from the western half of America.

She was arrested on July 4, 1917, with Lucy Burns and others, for protesting in front of the White House.  Rodgers was on the staff of The Suffragist and was an organizer for the National Woman's Party. Her sister, Matilda Young, was also an active suffragist.

She died of a heart attack on December 10, 1953.

References

1891 births
1953 deaths
American feminists
American suffragists
American women's rights activists
The Suffragist people
People from Falls Church, Virginia
Activists from Virginia
20th-century American women
20th-century American people